Hampton Pinckney is a neighborhood located in Greenville, South Carolina. One of the oldest neighborhoods in Greenville, it was where the textile industry was started in the early 19th century and lasted until the 1920s. The first trolley car in Greenville was installed in this neighborhood in 1899, opening for business in 1901.

This neighborhood was put into the National Register of Historic Places in December 1977.

References
City of Greenville, South Carolina historic districts, including Hampton-Pinckney. - accessed 27 June 2010.
History of Hampton-Pinckney Historic District in Greenville, South Carolina. - accessed 27 June 2010.
Official website. - accessed 27 June 2010.

Neighborhoods in Greenville, South Carolina